Sunday Sinners is a 1940 drama, comedy, musical and religious race film directed by and co-produced by Arthur Dreifuss and Jack Goldberg starring his wife Mamie Smith, Norman Astwood, Edna Mae Harris and Earl Sydnor.

Plot
The Club Harlem is jointly owned by Gene and Corrine Aiken who disagree on the matter of the Club being open on Sunday. Rev. Jesse Hampton is receiving pressure from his parishioners to demand the club be closed on Sunday. Other plots include a protection racket pressuring Gene Aiken, two con men attempting to cheat a Chinese laundryman, and the son of the Reverend getting a job at the Club Harlem.

Cast
 Norman Astwood as Gene Aiken
Edna Mae Harris as Corrine Aiken
 Earl Sydnor as Reverend Jesse Hampton
Mamie Smith as Midge
 Alec Lovejoy as Eli
 Cristola Williams as Creola
 Thelma Norton as Peggy Hampton
 Harold Norton as Earl Williams
 Augustus Smith as The Deacon
Sidney Easton as Bootsie

References

External links
 

1940 films
American black-and-white films
Race films
Films about Christianity
American drama films
1940 drama films
Films directed by Arthur Dreifuss
1940s English-language films
1940s American films